Lee Eun-hee (also Lee Eun-hui, ; born March 10, 1979) is a South Korean judoka, who competed in the women's half-lightweight category. She picked up a total of twelve medals in her career, including two golds each from the 2002 Asian Games in Busan and 2004 Asian Judo Championships in Almaty, Kazakhstan, and represented her nation South Korea in the 52-kg class at the 2004 Summer Olympics.

Lee first appeared in the international scene as part of the host nation's squad at the 2002 Asian Games in Busan, where she scored a double yuko point over China's Xian Dongmei for the gold medal in the 52-kg division.

At the 2004 Summer Olympics in Athens, Lee qualified for the South Korean squad in the women's half-lightweight class (52 kg), by topping the field and receiving a berth from the Asian Championships in Almaty, Kazakhstan. She lost her opening match to Cuba's Amarilis Savón, who successfully scored an ippon and quickly subdued her on the tatami with an o goshi (full hip throw) at one minute and twenty-four seconds. In the repechage, Lee gave herself a chance for an Olympic bronze medal, but slipped it away in a defeat to Sweden's Sanna Askelöf by an ippon victory and a kosoto gari (small outer reap) throw thirty-six seconds into their first round match.

References

External links

1979 births
Living people
Olympic judoka of South Korea
Judoka at the 2004 Summer Olympics
Judoka at the 2002 Asian Games
Asian Games medalists in judo
Sportspeople from Seoul
South Korean female judoka
Asian Games gold medalists for South Korea
Medalists at the 2002 Asian Games
20th-century South Korean women
21st-century South Korean women